Oakhurst–Gildersleeve Neighborhood Historic District is a national historic district located at Charlottesville, Virginia. The district encompasses 78 contributing buildings in a primarily residential section of the city of Charlottesville. It was developed between 1910 and the 1960s and includes examples of the Bungalow, Colonial Revival, and Tudor Revival styles.

It was listed on the National Register of Historic Places in 2009.

References

External links

Historic districts on the National Register of Historic Places in Virginia
Colonial Revival architecture in Virginia
Tudor Revival architecture in Virginia
Buildings and structures in Charlottesville, Virginia
National Register of Historic Places in Charlottesville, Virginia